Ernst Leutert (1898 – 1966) was a Swiss cyclist. He competed in the team pursuit at the 1924 Summer Olympics.

References

External links
 

1898 births
1966 deaths
Swiss male cyclists
Olympic cyclists of Switzerland
Cyclists at the 1924 Summer Olympics
Place of birth missing